Sunsets & Full Moons is the sixth studio album by Irish rock trio The Script, released on 8 November 2019 through Sony Music Entertainment. It is supported by the lead single "The Last Time". The Script embarked on a European tour in 2020 in promotion of the album, with Becky Hill acting as a support act.

Background
The band consider the album to be a sequel to their self-titled debut album, released in 2008, as both were "written and recorded following traumatic personal events" for lead singer Danny O'Donoghue, whose parents both died ten years apart. O'Donoghue called the album the "most poignant record we've ever made", and said "Our music was always about being together with the audience, and writing about your own feelings, and sharing them."

Track listing

Charts

Weekly charts

Year-end charts

Certifications

References

2019 albums
The Script albums